Paul Stone (born 	1968/1969) is an American businessman, and the president and chief executive officer (CEO) of The Hertz Corporation since May 2020.

Stone spent 28 years of his career with Walmart as a store manager rising to Western US divisional senior vice president.

In March 2018, Stone joined Hertz as head of its North American car rental operations, after having been the chief retail officer at Cabela's, an outdoors store chain.

On 18 May 2020, Stone was appointed president and CEO of Hertz, with immediate effect, succeeding Kathryn V. Marinello. Three days later the company filed for bankruptcy, but not before paying Stone $700,000.

References

1960s births
American chief executives of Fortune 500 companies
Living people
Walmart people